Bartley Louis Braverman (born February 1, 1946, Los Angeles) is an American actor, best known for playing Binzer on the ABC primetime series Vega$ (1978–1981). Braverman has also guest starred on many television shows.

Early years
Bart Braverman is the son of producer Herb Braverman and actress Kendall Carly Browne. His brother, Chuck Braverman, is a television director and producer. 

Braverman was billed as Bart Bradley in many of his early roles.

Career
Braverman made his professional acting debut in milk commercials, along with his brother. His television appearances include I Love Lucy, Seinfeld, M*A*S*H, and Shameless. Braverman played a protester in a Columbo episode which guest-starred Hector Elizondo. He did the voice of Puggsy on Fangface. Braverman played the key role of Dan Tanna's legman, Bobby "Binzer" Borso on Vega$. He was a regular co-star in all 69 Vega$ episodes, including the pilot, from 1978 to 1981. Binzer was detective Dan Tanna's field assistant and legman in and around Las Vegas. 

Braverman also has made frequent appearances on the game show Match Game during its run in syndication from 1979–82. In 1979 and 1980, he also appeared on the game shows Password Plus with Vega$ co-star Robert Urich. In 1984, he appeared on Match Game-Hollywood Squares Hour.

Braverman had a role on the television show Have Gun - Will Travel. He also co-starred in the 1982-83 television series The New Odd Couple.

His film credits include roles in 20 Million Miles to Earth (1957), Helter Skelter (1976), The Great Texas Dynamite Chase (1976), Alligator (1980), The Gladiator (1986), A Very Brady Christmas (1988) and 8 Heads in a Duffel Bag (1997).

Filmography

Films

Television

References

External links

1946 births
Living people
American male film actors
American male television actors
American male voice actors
20th-century American male actors
21st-century American male actors
Male actors from Los Angeles